Tremont may refer to:

Places
 Tremont, Victoria, a suburb of Melbourne, Australia
 Tremont, Nova Scotia, Canada

United States
 Tremont, Illinois
 Tremont, Indiana
 Tremont, Maine
 Tremont, Mississippi
 Tremont, Bronx, New York
 Tremont, Cleveland, a neighborhood in Ohio
 Tremont City, Ohio
 Tremont Township, Schuylkill County, Pennsylvania
 Tremont, Tennessee, a region of the Great Smoky Mountains National Park in the southeastern United States
 Tremont Street, a major thoroughfare in Boston, Massachusetts
 Tremont Avenue, a street in the Bronx, New York
 Boston, Massachusetts, originally called "Trimountaine" or "Tremont"

Surname
 Auguste Trémont, Luxembourgian sculptor

Other uses
 Tremont (microarchitecture), microarchitecture successor to Goldmont Plus
 Tremont (horse), American Thoroughbred racehorse
 Tremont station (disambiguation), railroad stations
 Tremont Avenue (disambiguation), rapid transit stations
 Tremont Group, a US hedge fund 
 Tremont Stakes, American Thoroughbred horse race
 Tremont House (Collingwood, Ontario), a historic building in Collingwood, Ontario, Canada
 Trémont (disambiguation)